"Got the Time" is a song written and performed by the British new wave musician Joe Jackson, appearing as the closing track on his 1979 debut album, Look Sharp!. The song has since been performed frequently in live concerts by Jackson.

The song was covered in 1990 by thrash metal band Anthrax and in 2021 by Finnish folk metal band Korpiklaani.

Background
Jackson had written "Got the Time" in 1977 before assembling the final version of the Joe Jackson Band. Jackson recalled the driving nature of the song was a struggle for his then drummer, Dave Cairns. Jackson explained in his memoir A Cure for Gravity:

In a live performance at Rock Goes to College, Jackson dedicated the song to "anyone out there who leads a hectic life". In the lyrics of the song, Jackson sings of a frantic lifestyle where he is constantly being encountered by new obligations and duties. Musically, the song is a fast-paced rock song with vocals by Jackson. He later described the song as "fast and frantic". In later live versions of the song (after Jackson split from the Joe Jackson Band), percussionist Sue Hadjopoulos plays a prominent conga rhythm.

Release and reception
The song was first released on Look Sharp!, and has since seen many other releases. A 1980 live version from the Beat Crazy tour appeared on the live album Live 1980/86, and a 2004 version appeared on Afterlife. A live performance was also released on a bonus CD with Jackson's 2003 album Volume 4. A live form of the song appeared on the compilation album This Is It! (The A&M Years 1979–1989). For the version that appeared on Live Music - Europe 2010, Jackson rearranged the song to not include guitar, since his touring band consisted of only Graham Maby and Dave Houghton. He explained, "I found it a tough one, ... which is why we left out the piano. My idea was to make the rhythm section overwhelming and really let them go crazy, to the point where you wouldn't miss anything else. So you just really have the bass and drums and the vocal, and it works."

In 2003, a writer for Billboard dubbed the song a "classic" and an "old favorite". Paste Magazine praised the song's "manic energy". Glide Magazine ranked it as Jackson's 10th best song.

Personnel
Joe Jackson – vocals
Gary Sanford – guitar
Graham Maby – bass
David Houghton – drums

Charts

Cover versions

Anthrax version 

"Got the Time" was covered by the American thrash metal band Anthrax on their album, Persistence of Time. This version was also released as a single by the band in 1990. The band's version was cited by AllMusic writer Steve Huey as the "standout track" from Persistence of Time.

Jackson did not hold Anthrax's version in high regard. In the June 1991 issue of Q magazine, Jackson remarked: "I think it sounds kind of clumsy compared to the way we did it on the Live album. I mean, our version is really smoking. Theirs is actually slower than ours, and kind of lumpen. The way I feel about it is, Thanks for the royalties, guys." In another interview, he explained, "I could never quite understand why they were called a 'speed metal' band because we played the song about twice as fast as they did."

 Personnel
 Joey Belladonna – lead vocals
 Dan Spitz – lead guitar, backing vocals
 Scott Ian – rhythm guitar, backing vocals
 Frank Bello – bass, backing vocals
 Charlie Benante – drums

 Charts

Other cover versions 
 Perfect Thyroid covered "Got the Time" on their 1997 album Musical Barnacles.
 The Donots did a cover of "Got the Time" in 2002.
 The Matches recorded a cover of "Got the Time" in 2004. A live version appeared on their 2016 live album Recomposer.
 Both Beth Thornley and Fabulous Disaster covered "Got the Time" on the 2004 album Different for Girls: Women Artists and Female-Fronted Bands Cover Joe Jackson.
 Brenda Earl Stokes covered "Got the Time" on her 2014 album Right About Now.
 Folk metal band Korpiklaani released a version with revamped lyrics, titled "Ennen" in 2021.

References
Citations

Sources

1979 songs
1990 singles
Songs written by Joe Jackson (musician)
Joe Jackson (musician) songs
Anthrax (American band) songs
Song recordings produced by David Kershenbaum